The Barrow Bombers were a speedway team promoted in Barrow-in-Furness that existed at various times from 1930 to 1985.

History
Speedway had been promoted at a number of venues in Barrow. In 1930, a number of meetings were held at Holker Street, the home of Barrow A.F.C., the towns football club. Racing moved to Little Park, Roose in 1931 but crowd levels were insufficient. 

In 1972, speedway returned to Holker Street after a 42-year absence, when the former Romford Bombers promotion who started the season at the West Ham Stadium in London moved the team north. The team were initially called the Barrow Happy Faces as their sponsor at the time was Duckhams Oil - its happy face logo was prominently displayed on the team's race jackets. The team finished 9th during the 1972 British League Division Two season.

The team were renamed Barrow Bombers for the 1973 and 1974 seasons, wher ethey finished 10th and 12th respectively. Despite good crowds, a new home had to be found for the team after the end of the 1974 season, when problems with ground sharing became insurmountable.

Local businessman Cliff Hindle built a new stadium at Park Road, which opened halfway through the 1977 season for a short series of open meetings. In 1978 a team was entered under the name Barrow Furness Flyers, but they finished bottom of the National League. Crowds were poor and the track closed after only one season.

Speedway in Barrow was revived once again in 1984, under the promotion of ex-Barrow rider Chris Roynon. A series of challenge matches were held to gauge public support. Interest was such that a team was entered for the 1985 season under the name of the Barrow Blackhawks. After a disastrous start to the season with an understrength team, the Blackhawks were thrown out of the league. A number of challenge matches were held for the remainder of the season in front of low crowds before the track once again closed.

Season summary

See also
List of defunct motorcycle speedway teams in the United Kingdom

References

Sport in Barrow-in-Furness
Defunct British speedway teams